Riti is both a given name and a surname. Notable people with the name include:

 Riti Pathak (born 1977), Indian politician
 Riti Singh (born 1996), Indian Navy pilot
 Rob Riti (born 1976), American football player